Billy Kelly may refer to:

 Billy Kelly (baseball) (1886–1940), American baseball player
 Billy Kelly (boxer) (1932–2010), boxer from Derry, Northern Ireland
 Billy Kelly (horse), American Thoroughbred racehorse
 Billy Kelly (snooker player), snooker player from Ireland

Kelly, Billy